Love to Love You, Donna Summer is an 2023 American documentary, directed by Roger Ross Williams and Brooklyn Sudano. It follows the life and career of Donna Summer.

It had its world premiere at the 73rd Berlin International Film Festival on February 17, 2023.

Plot
It follows the life and career of Donna Summer.

Production
In December 2021, it was announced Roger Ross Williams and Brooklyn Sudano would direct a documentary film revolving around Donna Summer.

Release
It had its world premiere at the 73rd Berlin International Film Festival on February 17, 2023. It will also screen at South by Southwest in March 2023. It is scheduled to be released in May 2023, by HBO.

References

External links
 

2023 films
2023 documentary films
American documentary films
Documentary films about women in music
2020s American films
HBO documentary films